The 2001 Pop Cola Panthers season was the 12th and final season of the franchise in the Philippine Basketball Association (PBA).

Draft picks

Transactions

Occurrences
Pop Cola played their first three games in the Governor's Cup under the brand name "Swift", which the franchise last used back in 1994, known as Swift Panthers, they scored their first win over Red Bull, then revert to Pop Cola in their fourth game.

The Pop Cola ballclub was disbanded the following season after the PBA franchise was sold by RFM Corporation to Coca-Cola Bottlers Philippines, Inc. (CCBPI), in connection with the sale of Cosmos Bottling Corporation to CCBPI.

Roster

 Team Manager: Elmer Yanga

Elimination round

Games won

References

Pop
Pop Cola Panthers seasons